Thilagar is a 2015 Indian Tamil-language action-drama film written and directed by Perumal Pillai. The film stars Kishore and Dhruvva in the lead roles while Mrudhula Bhaskar, Anumol and 'Poo' Ram among others form an ensemble cast. Music for the film was composed by Kannan, and the film opened to mixed reviews in March 2015.

Plot synopsis
Due to ideological differences, Ukkirapandi brutally murders Bose Pandian, the head of the village. Bose Pandian's brother Thilagar, a kind and peace-loving person, vows to seek revenge against Ukkirapandi and his sons.

Cast
 Kishore as Bose Pandian
 Dhruvva as Thilagar
 Mrudhula Bhaskar
 Anumol
 Poo Ram as Ukkirapandi
 Rajesh K. Narayanan
 Sujatha Master
 Neetu Chandra as item number "Bim Bam Bim"

Production
Perumal Pillai revealed that the film was based on a real-life incident from the 1990s, which revolved around two opposition clans in South Tamil Nadu. The film was predominantly shot around Tirunelveli, while the team also managed to feature a Dussehra festival live in Thiruchendur, as a part of the script. Dhruvva, a debutant actor from the USA, was cast in the title role of the film, while Mrudhula Bhaskar was signed on as the female lead. In preparation for her role, she researched her character by looking up similar roles played by actress Sripriya. An item number featuring Neetu Chandra was shot at Binny Mills to increase the film's commercial viability. The film held a press meet for the launch of its trailer and soundtrack in September 2014. During the launch, director Ameer criticised the makers of the film for adopting the title Thilagar for an action film, stating it instead should have been used for a biopic of Bal Gangadhar Tilak. In return, Perumal Pillai expressed his disappointment at Ameer's remark and retorted that Ameer's Raam (2005) had no link to the Ramayana.

Soundtrack 
The soundtrack was composed by Kannan.

Release
The film opened in March 2015 to mixed reviews, with a critic from Sify.com stating "what prevent Thilagar from being a classic is the unwanted romantic track, loud melodrama and abrupt ending", giving it an "average" verdict. Behindwoods.com also gave the film a middling review, adding "overall, Thilagar is a seen before, heard before story, supported by good performances from Kishore and Dhruwa". Likewise, The Hindu noted that the film had a "lot of gun powder, but no explosion".

Despite garnering average reviews, the film went relatively unnoticed and performed poorly at the box office.

References

2015 films
2010s Tamil-language films
Films about social issues in India
2015 directorial debut films